Carl Mullan (born 24 January 1990) is an Irish television and radio presenter currently hosting The RTÉ 2fm Breakfast Show with Doireann Garrihy and Donncha O'Callaghan.

Early life 
Mullan was born in Perrystown on the southside of Dublin. He attended Tempelogue College then Institute of Technology, Tallaght attaining an Honours degree in Creative Digital Media.

Radio career 
Mullan joined RTÉ 2fm in 2013 as a media content co-ordinator. In 2014 he was promoted to presenter, hosting various shows on RTÉ's digital station, RTÉ 2XM, as well as filling in for the 2fm’s main presenters in their absence. In 2015, Mullan had a recurring weekly segment on Nicky Byrne's show with Jenny Greene as the pair's 'Crash-Test Dummy'.

In 2019, Mullan joined Aifric O’Connell as the hosts of 2fm’s Weekend Breakfast.

In May 2021, it was announced that Mullan would join Donncha O'Callaghan in replacing Eoghan McDermott as Doireann Garrihy's co-host on the new RTÉ 2fm breakfast show.

Television career 
In 2019, Mullan hosted his own adventure/travel show Go Outside and Play for the RTÉ Player. The show returned for a second season in 2020, retitled Go Outside and Play, Local Adventures focusing on activities that can be done during the COVID-19 pandemic.

In September 2022, Mullan began co-hosting Takeaway Titans on RTÉ2 alongside James Kavanagh.

In December 2022, Mullan was announced as one of the eleven celebrities taking part in the sixth season of Dancing with the Stars. He was partnered with professional dancer, Emily Barker. On 19 March 2023, Mullan and Barker were crowned Dancing with the Stars champions for 2023.

Personal life 
In October 2020, Mullan announced his engagement to his long-term girlfriend, Aisling. In April 2021, the couple announced they were expecting their first child later in the year. In August 2021, the couple welcomed a son, Daibhí. On 22 April 2022 the couple were married.

References 

1990 births
Living people
Mass media people from Dublin (city)
RTÉ television presenters